The Keystone Association was a five–team Independent level baseball minor league that played in the 1884 and 1885 seasons. The Keystone Association featured franchises based exclusively in  Pennsylvania.

History
The Keystone Association formed as Independent level minor league in 1884. 

The Keystone Association was formed at a March 3, 1884 meeting in Lancaster, Pennsylvania. Carlisle, Pennsylvania and West Chester, Pennsylvania were franchises admitted to the league but never formed a team. The league adopted American Association rules. The league president was Thomas Hargreaves.
The 1884 Keystone Association played as a five–team Independent league. The Keystone Association hosted franchises based in Chambersburg, Pennsylvania, Chester, Pennsylvania, Lancaster, Pennsylvania, Littlestown, Pennsylvania and York, Pennsylvania.

The Keystone Association began play on May 2, 1884. The league then folded for the season on June 10, 1884. The League standings when the league folded were Lancaster Red Stockings (15–4), York White Roses (10–10), Chambersburg (8–10), Chester Blue Stockings (8–10) and Littlestown Brown Stockings (6–8). During the 1884 season, the Chester franchise disbanded on June 2, 1884 and Lancaster disbanded on June 7, 1884.

After the Keystone Association folded, York and Lancaster continued play, as the York White Roses and Lancaster Ironsides became members of the Eastern League for the remainder of the 1884 season. York replaced the Harrisburg Olympics after the Harrisburg, Pennsylvania based team folded. The Eastern League folded after the 1884 season.

In their final season of play, the 1885 Keystone Association returned to play and featured the same five returning franchises. Chambersburg, the Chester Blue Stockings, Lancaster Red Stockings, Littlestown Brown Stockings and York White Roses were the 1885 league members.

The 1885 Keystone Association final team standings are unknown.

The Keystone Association permanently folded after the 1885 season.

Keystone Association teams

League standings

1884 Keystone Association

1885 Keystone Association
The exact 1885 team records and standings are unknown

Notable alumni

Frank Berkelbach (1884), Littlestown
Bart Cantz (1884), Chambersburg/Littlestown
Fred Carl (1884), York
Dick Conway (1884), York
John Deasley (1884), Chester
Bill Farmer (1884), Chester
Ed Green (1884), Chambersburg/York
Ed Greer(1884), Littlestown
John Hiland (1884), Lancaster
John Hofford (1884), Littlestown
Will Holland (1884), Lancaster
Bill Jones (1884), Chester
Bobby Mitchell (1884), Chambersburg
James Morris (1884), Chambersburg
George Noftsker (1884), Chambersburg
Ed Sales (1884), Chambersburg
Lewis Smith (1884), York
Mike Tiernan (1884), Chambersburg
Charlie Waitt (1884), Lancaster
George Wetzel (1884), Lancaster
Henry Zeiher (1884), York

References

Defunct minor baseball leagues in the United States
Baseball leagues in Pennsylvania
Defunct professional sports leagues in the United States
Sports leagues established in 1884
Sports leagues disestablished in 1885
1885 disestablishments in Pennsylvania